SWP may stand for: State Water Program
California State Water Project
Saskatchewan Wheat Pool
Scientific WorkPlace, a mathematics tool with LaTeX support
Single Wire Protocol
Skill with prize, a category of slot machine
Socialist Workers Party (disambiguation), initials used by some parties with this name
Southwest Pennsylvania Railroad, reporting mark
Stiftung Wissenschaft und Politik, German Institute for International and Security Affairs
 Sherwin-Williams Paints, a line of paint sold by Sherwin-Williams
 Association "Polish Community", (Stowarzyszenie "Wspólnota Polska")
 Südwest Presse, German newspaper
Survey of Western Palestine, a survey of Palestine in the late 19th century.
Swiss Water Process, a method of coffee decaffeination
 .swp, a file extension used by Vim
Wikimedia Polska